Merimnetria mendax is a moth of the family Gelechiidae. It was first described by Lord Walsingham in 1907. It is endemic to the Hawaiian island of Kauai.

The wingspan is 10–12 mm. The forewings are pale fawn ocherous, profusely sprinkled and minutely mottled with fawn brown, almost obliterating the paler ground color, a few blackish specks along the costa, especially before the middle. The hindwings are pale gray.

References

External links

Moths described in 1907
Merimnetria
Endemic moths of Hawaii